Mars Hill Bible Church is an American non-denominational Christian megachurch located in Grandville, Michigan near Grand Rapids. The teaching pastor was Rob Bell until December, 2011 when Bell transitioned into another ministry and was succeeded by his friend and fellow Mars Hill pastor Shane Hipps. In August 2012, the church announced to its members that Kent Dobson, son of well-known church leader and speaker Ed Dobson, would assume the position of teaching pastor. Dobson was then succeeded in August 2016 by AJ Sherrill, former pastor of Trinity Grace Church: Chelsea in NYC. In 2020, Sherrill departed from the church and in 2021 was succeeded by Ashlee Eiland and Troy Hatfield.

History
Founded in February 1999, the church's services, or "gatherings", were originally celebrated in a school gym in Wyoming, Michigan.  Based on the idea that worship could be stripped down to its simplest form, it quickly grew in popularity.  Through word-of-mouth and the launch support of Calvary Church in Grand Rapids, Michigan, the church attracted about 1,000 visitors to their first gathering.  Within a year the church had the defunct Grand Village Mall donated to them and purchased the land on which it is now located in Grandville, Michigan.  After some remodeling, the 3,500 seat facility opened its doors in July 2000. In the early 2000s, the church attracted around 6,000 churchgoers to its two Sunday services and up to 50,000 downloads per week. As of 2018, this community has worked hard to establish themselves as a local church, while still offering weekly podcasts of their teachings that are listened to by thousands around the world. Their current weekly attendance is around 2500.

Leadership
The church's founding pastor, Rob Bell, founded the church at 28 years old, and served as Mars Hill's Teaching Pastor until 2011.  On August 1, 2005, Zondervan Publishing released his first book, Velvet Elvis: Repainting the Christian Faith.  His second book, Sex God, was released in 2007 through the same publishing company, and in 2008, former Lead Pastor Don Golden co-wrote a book with Bell titled "Jesus Wants to Save Christians: A Manifesto for the Church in Exile." Upon Golden's departure, Mars Hill shifted to a team leadership structure while retaining an executive pastor, currently Brian Mucci. In 2010 Shane Hipps joined Mars Hill, splitting time with Bell as teaching pastor. Hipps had previously pastored a small Mennonite Church in Arizona, Trinity Mennonite Church. Prior to his pastoral ministry, Hipps had worked in marketing and advertising for Porsche.  In March 2011 Bell released a book titled Love Wins: A Book About Heaven, Hell And The Fate Of Every Person Who Ever Lived. The church announced on 9 September 2011 that Bell would be leaving the church in pursuit of new opportunities. On 18 December 2011, Bell delivered his final message as the head pastor of Mars Hill, saying farewell to the community in which he had a critical role in launching nearly 13 years prior.

Following Bell's departure, a national search was conducted and in August 2012, it was announced that Kent Dobson would take over the role as sole teaching pastor. Previously, Dobson had served as worship director during the early years of the church. 

In November 2015, Dobson announced he was leaving Mars Hill telling the congregation "being a pastor at a church is not really who I am." Dobson was succeeded in August 2016 by AJ Sherrill, former pastor of Trinity Grace Church: Chelsea in NYC.

In August 2020, Sherrill announced his departure from Mars Hill. In summer of 2021, it was announced that Ashlee Eiland and former worship pastor Troy Hatfield would fill in Sherrill's role as co-lead pastors.

Church experience
The church is somewhat different from other large mega-churches in that it places little emphasis on high-tech production during its weekly gatherings. The church's sanctuary (formerly the anchor store of the mall) reflects this simplistic outlook; the sanctuary walls are a light gray with a black ceiling, the lights are low, and there is a freestanding homemade wooden cross in the sanctuary on communion Sundays. The multimedia projections are white text on a black background with no additional flair or background images. There is a belief that the gatherings should not be a performance as many megachurches are often known for, but should be the gathering of the church in worship and the place where the church is, in turn, motivated to go out and live the life of the gospel, the kingdom of God within the world.

Mars Hill receives the financial tithes and offerings of the people through "joy boxes" that are located in the back of the room (versus a traditional “pass the plate” tithing moment).  The initial 25% of the offering is given away to global and local partners in order to "join God where He is already at work among some of the most church-forsaken peoples, places and issues of our city and world." This figure is public knowledge and the individual missionaries supported are highlighted on a regular basis through preaching stories, video testimonies, and strategic updates in "the Sheet", their bi-weekly bulletin.  The mission of Mars Hill Bible Church is "To be a Jesus people for the sake of the world."

Narrative theology
Their approach to theology is narrative in nature, seeking to view the Scripture as an unfolding drama in which the church has a unique role. Matt Krick, lead pastor at Bay Marin Community Church, and a former pastor at Mars Hill and former intern for Rob Bell, greatly influenced the theological approach of Mars Hill. Matt is influenced by theologians like Brian Walsh, Sylvia Keesmaat, Richard Middleton, and Steven Bouma-Prediger.

Their New Exodus Theology, which former lead pastor Don Golden introduced, follows a narrate study of the Exodus narrative and the OT’s prophetic voices of new exodus, which is fulfilled in Jesus of Nazareth.  The New Exodus motif, in his view, can be expressed as follows. It begins in Egypt where God "hears the cry" of the oppressed.  It moves to Sinai where God makes a covenant with the descendants of Abraham, giving them a "purpose and mission."  Third - Jerusalem - where Israel has a choice to be "indifferent" using forced labor to build their own kingdom or to promote a "kingdom of righteousness and justice."  Finally, Babylon is the place where there is hope for a New Exodus, that ultimately climaxes in Jesus' life, death, and resurrection.  The church, in Golden's view, is called to live out the gospel in missional and communal ways, particularly promoting the care of the poor and oppressed of our world. This approach is considered by the ministry of Mars Hill to be a holistic understanding of the bible. 
N.T. Wright presents his five-act hermeneutic as follows. Today we find ourselves within the fifth act, called to live out the gospel in imaginative, creative, and improvisational ways.

Act 1 - Creation,
Act 2 - Fall,
Act 3 - Israel,
Act 4 - Jesus,
Act 5 - Church,

(NB: Other theologians, Middleton and Walsh, have add a sixth act, the eschaton or the consummation, but suggest that we still find ourselves in the midst of the fifth act.)

Grand Village Mall
Mars Hill Bible Church occupies a building which was originally a shopping mall called Grand Village Mall. The mall, including a Witmark catalog showroom as an anchor store, closed in the late 1990s and was converted into the current home of Mars Hill.

References

External links
 Mars Hill Bible Church - Sermon Audio
 Christianity Today Magazine

Evangelical megachurches in the United States
Churches in Michigan
Churches in Kent County, Michigan
Christian organizations established in 1999
1999 establishments in Michigan